Aphasia is an American rock band based in California.

History
Forming in 1999, the band solidified their sound and lineup in high school, and began playing shows around the Bay Area, their local area.

The band cited their main influences to be Deftones, Foo Fighters, Green Day, Refused, Incubus, Blindside, Hoobastank and Cursive.

Aphasia's music and style was directly influenced by their collaborative approach to writing, its members being proficient in several forms of instrumentation and contributing to all aspects of the creative process.

The band earned their first studio time after winning a local battle of the bands. In 2001, they recorded and released their first three-song demo in Oakland, California. After that, the band continued the writing and recording independently using a portable, makeshift recording studio that Harber had slowly begun to accumulate.

By 2002 they had come to the attention of Trapt, another Northern Californian post-grunge band. Trapt's management, Zig-Zag Communications, mentored Aphasia and provided them with industry and record-release assistance. Their first release was a three-song teaser EP; shortly thereafter, in 2004, they released their first self-titled album. In 2005, DRT Entertainment re-sequenced, re-titled, and re-released the album as Fact and Fiction.

In 2005, the band toured as an opener for Trapt, alongside Blindside. Eventually going on to tour throughout the United States with various independent acts spanning a broad range genres. Later that year, their single "Flatline" was featured in the movie War of the Worlds.

In early 2006, Aphasia wrote, recorded and released their final EP, "Make Out Like Bandits", which many cited as being the beginning of a drastic stylistic shift. The four-song EP contained major and minor counterpoint tonality, atypical instrumentation, and pop vocal hooks. The reaction of their listeners was ultimately mixed, acclaimed by some while being criticized by others due to their hard rock following.

In mid 2007, the band announced they had parted ways with Will Peng and would disband as "Aphasia". It has been verified and confirmed by the entire band that parting ways was a mutual decision. Admittedly, there were differences that went unresolved for several years but eventually maintaining the relationship that originally brought them together far outweighed perpetuating a collaboration performing music that its members had long since outgrown. Their differences have since been resolved.

Aphasia has changed their music style and name to DownDownDown.

Band members
Jeff Harber (vocals)
Drew DeHaven (guitar); replaced by: Aaron Prim
Jayce Basques (bass)
Nick Allen (drums); replaced by: William Peng

Discography

Albums
Debut S/T (released in 2001, self-produced)
Industry Sampler (released in 2003)
Aphasia S/T (released in 2004, under Joint Venture)
Fact and Fiction (released in 2005, under DRT entertainment)
Make Out Like Bandits (released in 2006)

Singles
 "Flatline"
 "Away from You"
 "House of Cards"

Burlingame, California
Musical groups established in 2001
Alternative rock groups from California
American post-hardcore musical groups
Arts & Crafts Productions artists
2001 establishments in California